Battle of Smyrna may refer to:
Smyrniote crusades (1343–51)
Siege of Smyrna (1402)
Greek landing at Smyrna (1919)
Great Smyrna Offensive (1922)
Turkish capture of Smyrna (1922)

See also
Occupation of Smyrna (1919–22)
Great Fire of Smyrna (1922)
Smyrna, Georgia, site of a battle of the American Civil War (1864)